The United States men's national soccer team (USMNT) represents the United States in men's international soccer competitions. The team is controlled by the United States Soccer Federation and is a member of FIFA and CONCACAF.

The U.S. team has appeared in eleven FIFA World Cups, including the first in 1930, where they reached the semi-finals to finish third, the best result ever by a team from outside UEFA and CONMEBOL. They returned in 1934 and 1950, defeating England 1–0 in the latter, but did not qualify again until 1990. As host in 1994, the U.S. received an automatic berth and lost to Brazil in the round of sixteen. They qualified for the next five World Cups (seven consecutive appearances (1990–2014), a feat shared with only seven other nations), becoming one of the tournament's regular competitors and often advancing to the knockout stage. The U.S. reached the quarter-finals in 2002, and controversially lost to Germany. In the 2009 Confederations Cup, the Americans eliminated top-ranked Spain in the semi-finals before losing to Brazil in the final, the team's only appearance in the final of a major intercontinental tournament.

The U.S. also competes in continental tournaments, including the CONCACAF Gold Cup and Copa América. The U.S. won seven Gold Cups and the inaugural edition of the CONCACAF Nations League, and finished fourth in two Copa Américas in 1995 and 2016. The team has been led by interim head coach Anthony Hudson since January 2023. The team's most recent general manager was Brian McBride, who left the role in January 2023.

History

Early years
The first U.S. national soccer team was constituted in 1885, when it played Canada in the first international match held outside the United Kingdom. Canada defeated the U.S. 1–0 in Newark, New Jersey. The U.S. had its revenge the following year when it beat Canada 1–0, also in Newark, although neither match was officially recognized. The U.S. earned both silver and bronze medals in men's soccer at the 1904 St. Louis Summer Olympics through Christian Brothers College and St. Rose Parish, though the tournament is declared official only by the IOC (FIFA doesn't endorse tournaments held before 1908). The U.S. played its first official international match under the auspices of U.S. Soccer on August 20, 1916, against Sweden in Stockholm, where the U.S. won 3–2.

The U.S. fielded a team in the 1930 World Cup in Uruguay, the first ever World Cup to be played. The U.S. began group play by beating Belgium 3–0. The U.S. then earned a 3–0 victory over Paraguay, with FIFA crediting Bert Patenaude with two of the goals. In November 2006, FIFA announced that it had accepted evidence that Patenaude scored all three goals against Paraguay, and was thus the first person to score a hat trick in a World Cup. In the semifinals, the U.S. lost to Argentina 6–1. There was no third place game. However, using the overall tournament records in 1986, FIFA credited the U.S. with a third-place finish ahead of fellow semifinalist Yugoslavia. This remains the U.S. team's best World Cup result, and is the highest finish of any team from outside of South America and Europe.

The U.S. qualified for the 1934 World Cup by defeating Mexico 4–2 in Italy a few days before the finals started. In a straight knock-out format, the team first played host Italy and lost 7–1, eliminating the U.S. from the tournament. At the 1936 Olympic Games in Berlin, the U.S. again lost to Italy in the first round and were eliminated, although this time with a score of 1–0. Italy went on to win both tournaments, being a dominant team of that era.

The 1950 World Cup in Brazil was the next World Cup appearance for the U.S., as it withdrew in 1938 and the tournament wasn't held again until 1950. The U.S. lost its first match 3–1 against Spain, but then won 1–0 against England at Independência Stadium in Belo Horizonte. Striker Joe Gaetjens was the goal scorer. Called "The Miracle on Grass", the result is considered one of the greatest upsets in the history of the World Cup. In their third game of the tournament, a 5–2 defeat by Chile saw the U.S. eliminated from the tournament. The U.S. would not make another appearance in the World Cup finals for four decades.

1960s–1980s
The national team spent the mid-to-late 20th century in near complete irrelevance in both the international game and the domestic sporting scene. There was only one World Cup berth for CONCACAF during this period until 1982. The emergence of the North American Soccer League in the 1960s and 1970s raised hopes that the U.S. national team would soon improve and become a global force. However such hopes were not realized and by the 1980s the U.S. Soccer Federation found itself in serious financial struggles, with the national team playing only two matches from 1981 to 1983. U.S. Soccer targeted the 1984 Summer Olympics in Los Angeles and the 1986 World Cup as means of rebuilding the national team and its fan base. The International Olympic Committee declared that teams from outside Europe and South America could field full senior teams, including professionals (until then, the amateur-only rule had heavily favored socialist countries from Eastern Europe whose players were professionals in all but name). The U.S. had a very strong showing at the tournament, beating Costa Rica, tying Egypt, losing only to favorite Italy and finishing 1–1–1 but didn't make the second round, losing to Egypt on a tiebreaker (both had three points).

To provide a more stable national team program and renew interest in the NASL, U.S. Soccer entered the national team into the NASL league schedule for the 1983 season as Team America. This team lacked the continuity and regularity of training that conventional clubs enjoy, and many players were unwilling to play for the national team instead of their own clubs when conflicts arose. Team America finished the season at the bottom of the league, with U.S. Soccer canceling the experiment and withdrawing the national team from the NASL after one season. By the end of 1984, the NASL had folded, leaving the U.S. without a single professional-level outdoor soccer league.

The U.S. bid to host the 1986 FIFA World Cup after Colombia withdrew from contention due to economic concerns, but FIFA selected Mexico to host the tournament. In the last game of CONCACAF qualifying for the 1986 World Cup, the U.S. needed only a tie against Costa Rica to reach the final qualification group against Honduras and Canada. U.S. Soccer scheduled the game to be played in Torrance, California, an area with many Costa Rican expatriates, and marketed the game almost exclusively to the Costa Rican community. Costa Rica won the match 1–0, and kept the U.S. from reaching its fourth World Cup finals.

In 1988, U.S. Soccer attempted to re-implement its national-team-as-club concept, offering contracts to players to train with the national program full-time while occasionally loaning them to club teams as a revenue source for the federation. This brought many key veterans back into the program and allowed the team to begin playing more matches which, combined with an influx of talent from new youth clubs and leagues established across the nation in the wake of the NASL's popularity, allowed the national team to end the 1980s with optimism and higher hopes of qualifying for the 1990 World Cup than had existed for previous tournaments.

1990s
On July 4, 1988, FIFA named the U.S. as the host of the 1994 World Cup under significant international criticism given the perceived weakness of the national team and the lack of a professional outdoor league. The success of the 1984 Summer Olympics played the major role in FIFA's decision. Criticism diminished somewhat when a 1–0 win against Trinidad and Tobago, the first road win for the U.S. in nearly two years, in the last match of the 1989 CONCACAF Championship, earned the U.S. its first World Cup appearance in 40 years.

The team was coached by Bob Gansler, Wisconsin-Milwaukee and U20 national team coach, in preparation for the 1990 World Cup in Italy, with two of the team's more experienced players, Rick Davis and Hugo Perez, recovering from serious injuries and unavailable for selection. Rather than fill out his team with veteran professionals from U.S. indoor soccer leagues, Gansler and his assistant Stejem Mark chose to select many younger players with better conditioning for the outdoor game, including several collegiate players such as Virginia goalkeeper Tony Meola. The U.S. entered the tournament as massive underdogs and suffered defeats in all three of its group games to Czechoslovakia, Italy, and Austria. Defenders Jimmy Banks and Desmond Armstrong became the first African Americans to appear in a World Cup match for the United States.

In a noteworthy match, in 1993 U.S. Cup, the U.S. beat England by 2–0.

After qualifying automatically as the host of the 1994 World Cup under Bora Milutinović, the U.S. opened its tournament schedule with a 1–1 tie against Switzerland in the Pontiac Silverdome in the suburbs of Detroit, the first World Cup game played indoors. In its second game, the U.S. faced Colombia, then ranked fourth in the world, at the Rose Bowl. Aided by an own goal from Andrés Escobar, the U.S. won 2–1. Escobar was later murdered in his home country, possibly in retaliation for this mistake. Despite a 1–0 loss to Romania in its final group game, the U.S. made it past the initial round for the first time since 1930. In the round of 16, the U.S. lost 1–0 to the eventual champion Brazil. Despite this success, the team fired Bora in 1995, reportedly because he was not interested in administrative duties.

In a 1995 friendly, the U.S. came back from 3–0 to win 4–3 against Saudi Arabia, the biggest comeback in the team's history. That same year, the team participated as guest team in the 1995 Copa América, where they finished 1st on its group after beating Chile and Argentina, advancing to quarter finals. On that stage, the U.S. defeated Mexico on penalties but lost to Brazil 1–0 in semifinals. United States finished 4th. after losing to Colombia 4–1.

In the 1998 World Cup in France, the team lost all three group matches, 2–0 to Germany, 2–1 to Iran, and 1–0 to Yugoslavia, finishing dead last in the field of 32. Head coach Steve Sampson received much of the blame for the performance as a result of abruptly cutting team captain John Harkes, whom Sampson had named "Captain for Life" shortly before, as well as several other players who were instrumental to the qualifying effort, from the squad. Thomas Dooley became the Captain at that point. It emerged in February 2010 that Sampson removed Harkes from the team due to Harkes allegedly having an affair with teammate Eric Wynalda's wife.

Early 21st century (2000–2019)

The U.S. qualified for the 2002 World Cup; under Bruce Arena, the U.S. reached the quarterfinals, its best finish in a World Cup since 1930. The team advanced in the group stage with a 1W–1L–1D record, beginning with a 3–2 upset win over Portugal, followed by a 1–1 tie with co-host and eventual semifinalist, South Korea. The third and final match was a 3–1 loss to Poland; the team still got to the round of 16 when South Korea defeated Portugal. This set the stage for a face-off with continental rivals Mexico, the first time they met in a World Cup. The U.S. won the game 2–0. Brian McBride opened the scoring early, and Landon Donovan doubled the lead in the 65th minute. In the quarterfinals, where it met Germany, the U.S. lost 1–0 after being denied a penalty when Torsten Frings handled the ball to prevent a Gregg Berhalter goal. All of the U.S. games in the 2002 World Cup were played in South Korea and all their victories came wearing the white uniform, while their only defeats came while wearing the blue uniform. Donovan won the Best Young Player for the tournament.

In the 2006 World Cup, after finishing top of the CONCACAF qualification tournament, the U.S. was drawn into Group E along with the Czech Republic, Italy, and Ghana. The United States opened its tournament with a 3–0 loss to the Czech Republic. The team then tied 1–1 against Italy, who went on to win the World Cup. The U.S. was then knocked out of the tournament when beaten 2–1 by Ghana in its final group match, with Clint Dempsey scoring the U.S.'s only goal in the tournament – the goal against Italy had been an own goal by Italian defender Cristian Zaccardo. Following the tournament, Arena's contract was not renewed. After the national team remained dormant for the rest of 2006 while negotiating with various coaches, the federation hired former Chicago Fire, MetroStars and Chivas USA head coach Bob Bradley in early 2007.

Bradley began his competitive career with the national team with the 2007 Gold Cup. In the final, the United States beat Mexico 2–1, which qualified it for the 2009 Confederations Cup.

The U.S. had a notable performance at the 2009 Confederations Cup. In the semifinals, the U.S. defeated Spain 2–0. At the time, Spain was atop the FIFA World Rankings and was on a run of 35 games undefeated. With the win, the United States advanced to its first-ever final in a men's FIFA tournament. The team lost 3–2 to Brazil after leading 2–0 at half time.

The United States then hosted the 2009 Gold Cup. In the final, the United States was beaten by Mexico 5–0. This defeat broke the U.S. team's 58-match home unbeaten streak against CONCACAF opponents, and was the first home loss to Mexico since 1999.

In the Fourth round of the 2010 World Cup qualification, the U.S. began by beating Mexico 2–0. The February 2009 loss extended Mexico's losing streak against America on U.S. soil to 11 matches. Jozy Altidore became the youngest U.S. player to score a hat-trick, in a 3–0 victory over Trinidad and Tobago. Near the end of the summer of 2009, the United States lost 2–1 to Mexico at Estadio Azteca. On October 10, the U.S. secured qualification to the 2010 World Cup with a 3–2 win over Honduras. Four days later, the U.S. finished in first place in the group with a 2–2 tie against Costa Rica.

In the 2010 FIFA World Cup, the U.S. team was drawn in Group C against England, Slovenia and Algeria. After drawing against England (1–1) and Slovenia (2–2), the U.S. defeated Algeria 1–0 with a stoppage-time goal from Landon Donovan, taking first place in a World Cup Finals group for the first time since 1930. In the round of 16, the U.S. was eliminated by Ghana, 2–1. On FIFA's ranking of World Cup teams the U.S. finished in 12th place out of the 32-team field.

The U.S. again hosted the Gold Cup in 2011. The U.S. advanced past the group stage, then defeated Jamaica 2–0 in the quarterfinals and Panama 1–0 in the semifinals before losing to Mexico 4–2 in the final. Later in the summer, Bob Bradley was relieved of his duties and former German national team manager Jürgen Klinsmann was hired as head coach.

The U.S. had some success in friendlies in 2012 and 2013. The U.S. team won 1–0 in Italy on February 29, 2012, the team's first-ever win over Italy. On June 2, 2013, the U.S. played a friendly against Germany at a sold-out RFK Stadium in Washington D.C., with the U.S. winning 4–3. In July 2013, the U.S. hosted the 2013 CONCACAF Gold Cup where it went undefeated in the group stage and won with a 1–0 victory over Panama in the final, with Landon Donovan winning the tournament's golden ball award.

A 4–3 victory over Bosnia and Herzegovina in an international friendly match in Sarajevo represented the 12th straight win for the USMNT, the longest winning streak for any team in the world at that time. The 12 game winning streak ended September 6, 2013, when the U.S. lost to Costa Rica 3–1 in San José. In 2013 the national team played the final round of qualification, and by defeating Mexico in September, the U.S. clinched a spot in the 2014 World Cup.

The U.S. absorbed many German elements leading up to the 2014 World Cup. U.S.'s German head coach Jürgen Klinsmann surprised the U.S. soccer world by calling up five "Jürgen Americans"—half-blooded Germans born and professionally trained in Germany—to the 23-men squad in the 2014 FIFA World Cup. The U.S. was drawn into Group G, along with Ghana, Germany, and Portugal. The U.S. took revenge on the Ghanaians, winning 2–1. They tied their second group game against Portugal 2–2. In the final game of the group stage, the U.S. fell to Germany 1–0, but moved on to the knockout stage on goal difference. This was the first time that the team made two consecutive trips to the knockout stage of the FIFA World Cup. In the round of 16, the U.S. lost 2–1 to Belgium in extra time, despite goalkeeper Tim Howard making a World Cup record 15 saves during the match.

The national team's next tournament under Klinsmann was the 2015 CONCACAF Gold Cup. The U.S. were eliminated by Jamaica 2–1 in the semifinals, before losing to Panama on penalties in the third place match. The fourth-place finish was the worst Gold Cup performance by the national team since 2000, and the first time the team failed to make the tournament final since 2003. In the 2015 CONCACAF Cup playoff to determine the region's entry to the 2017 FIFA Confederations Cup, the U.S. were defeated 3–2 by Mexico at the Rose Bowl. In June 2016, the U.S. played as hosts of Copa América Centenario. The U.S. topped Group A on goal difference against Colombia. The U.S. beat Ecuador 2–1 in the quarterfinals, but then fell to Argentina 4–0 and lost to Colombia again 1–0 in the third place match. They finished fourth at the Copa América, tying their best finish ever in 1995.

Following consecutive losses to Mexico and Costa Rica in the opening games of the final round of qualification for the 2018 FIFA World Cup, Klinsmann was removed as national team coach and technical director and replaced by previous U.S. head coach Bruce Arena. World Cup qualification resumed on March 24, 2017, where Arena and his team had a record 6–0 win over Honduras. Four days later, the team traveled to Panama City, drawing Panama 1–1. After beating Trinidad and Tobago 2–0, the U.S. got their third ever result in World Cup Qualification at the Estadio Azteca when they drew 1–1 against Mexico. In July 2017, the U.S. won their sixth CONCACAF Gold Cup with a 2–1 win over Jamaica in the final. Following a 2–1 defeat to Trinidad and Tobago on October 10, 2017, the U.S. failed to qualify for the 2018 World Cup, missing the tournament for the first time since 1986. Many pundits and analysts called this the worst result and worst performance in the history of the national team.

Following Arena's resignation on October 13, 2017, assistant coach Dave Sarachan was named interim head coach during the search for a permanent replacement. The search for a permanent head coach was delayed by the USSF presidential election in February 2018 and the hiring of Earnie Stewart as general manager in June 2018. Gregg Berhalter, coach of the Columbus Crew and a former USMNT defender, was announced as the team's new head coach on December 2, 2018.

Current USMNT (2019–present)
Under Berhalter the team lost in the 2019 Gold Cup Final 1–0 against Mexico, denying them a chance at becoming back to back champions. Throughout the coronavirus pandemic, an influx of new young talent began to grow into a host of players playing for top European clubs, with Christian Pulisic, Weston McKennie, Tyler Adams, Yunus Musah, Brendan Aaronson, Sergiño Dest, and Gio Reyna being some of the more notable names. This new group won the inaugural CONCACAF Nations League in 2021 with a classic 3–2 victory against Mexico in the final. An entirely different team also won the Gold Cup against Mexico later that summer. With a 1–0 friendly victory over Bosnia and Herzegovina on December 18, 2021, the team set a program record for wins in a calendar year, with 17 wins, 2 losses, and 3 draws. The young group has been widely described as America's golden generation.

The United States qualified for the 2022 World Cup by finishing third in the final qualifying round. The qualifying campaign included an unbeaten record at home and a draw away to Mexico at Estadio Azteca. Grouped with England, Iran, and Wales in Group B, the team advanced to the knockout stage as runners-up with five points and without losing a game. There, they faced the Netherlands, suffering a 1–3 defeat. Midfielder Kellyn Acosta became the first Asian American to appear for the US at a World Cup.

Team image

Uniform and crest 

Since their first unofficial game against Canada, the most common U.S. uniform has been white tops with blue shorts. In 1950, the U.S. adopted a Peru-styled diagonal stripe or "sash" across the shirt. The stripe has been on third uniforms for 2003, 2004, and 2006, as well as the 2010 home, road and third uniforms. An additional color scheme based on the U.S. flag has been occasionally used (most prominently in the 1994 World Cup and 2012–13 qualifiers as well the 1983 Team America franchise of the North American Soccer League) comprising a shirt with red and white stripes with blue shorts.

German brand Adidas provided the uniform for the United States from 1984 until 1994. Since 1995, American company Nike has been the uniform supplier.

Uniform suppliers

Rivalries

Mexico

The teams of Mexico and the United States are widely considered as the two major powers of CONCACAF. Matches between the two nations often attract much media attention, public interest and comment in both countries. Although the first match was played in 1934, their rivalry was not considered major until the 1980s, when the teams began to frequently compete in CONCACAF cups. On August 15, 2012, the United States defeated Mexico at Estadio Azteca in the first victory for the U.S. against Mexico on Mexican soil in 75 years.
Ever since their first meeting in 1934, the two teams have met 74 times, with Mexico leading the overall series 36–22–16 (W–L–T), outscoring the U.S. 144–86. However, since the 1990s, the tide began to change due to a rapid growth of soccer in the United States. During the 21st century, the series has favored the U.S. 17–9–7 (W–L–T). Either the United States or Mexico has won every edition of the CONCACAF Gold Cup except one (the 2000 CONCACAF Gold Cup was won by Canada).

Canada
The US has a second, less bitter rival in Canada. This stems from a generally friendly rivalry between the two nations. The two teams frequently face each other in the Gold Cup, however the United States has historically been the stronger side. America currently leads the series 16-10-12 (W-L-T). The United States has qualified for 11 World Cups while Canada has qualified for two. Until recently, Canada was not seen as a competitive rival by a number of American fans as they had not beaten the United States in a 34-year stretch. That streak was snapped on October 15, 2019, when Canada defeated the United States 2–0 at BMO Field in Toronto. The following month, on November 15, the United States beat Canada 4–1 in Orlando. Since then, matches between the two have been very competitive. The US defeated Canada 1–0 in a 2021 Gold Cup matchup in Kansas City. In 2022 World Cup qualifying, Canada earned a 1–1 draw in Nashville and defeated the US 2–0 in Hamilton.

Costa Rica
In recent years the United States has also begun to develop a rivalry with Costa Rica. The most notable match, and the impetus of the rivalry itself, occurred on Friday, March 22, 2013, in a 2014 World Cup qualifying match played at Dick's Sporting Goods Park in Commerce City under blizzard conditions. Costa Rica filed a protest with FIFA due to field conditions when the United States won the game 1–0, but the protest was denied.  The game has already been dubbed in soccer lore as "Snow Clasico" for the conditions.  The United States have never defeated Costa Rica in Costa Rica, losing 10 meetings and drawing twice.

Supporters

There have been two main supporter groups backing the United States men's national soccer team, Sam's Army and The American Outlaws. Sam's Army started shortly after the 1994 World Cup in the United States and were active through 2014. Sam's Army members wore red to matches and sung or chanted throughout the match. They often brought huge U.S. flags and other banners to the game.

The American Outlaws was started in Lincoln, Nebraska in 2007 as a local supporters' group. The group's membership attempted to address a lack of consistency from game to game in supporter organization and social events on match days. To achieve this goal, the American Outlaws became a nationwide, non-profit supporters' group. Some American Outlaws members wear U.S. flag bandanas over their faces and commonly wear soccer supporter scarves. Some branches of the American Outlaws have their own scarves specific to their branch.

The U.S. men's national team has had a tremendous following on social media, especially Twitter and Instagram in recent years. Interest in young American players and the attention they bring has led to an increase in foreign investment in U.S. players.

Home stadium

The United States does not have a dedicated national stadium like most other national teams; instead, the team has played their home matches at 116 venues in 29 states and the District of Columbia. Robert F. Kennedy Memorial Stadium, located in the national capital of Washington, D.C., has hosted 24 matches, the most of any stadium. The state of California has hosted 114 matches, the most of any state, and the Los Angeles metropolitan area has hosted 77 matches at several venues in and around the city of Los Angeles. The Los Angeles Memorial Coliseum hosted 20 matches from 1965 to 2000, but fell out of use due to its age. The Rose Bowl, a 92,000-seat venue in Pasadena, has hosted 17 national team matches, as well as the 1994 FIFA World Cup Final, the 1999 FIFA Women's World Cup Final, and the 1984 Olympics Gold Medal Match.

Media coverage
Warner Bros. Discovery Sports has the English language rights for U.S. Soccer broadcasts from 2022 to 2030. All matches are streaming live on HBO Max with matches also on TNT and TBS. In  June 2021, CBS Sports acquired partial rights to select U.S. Soccer matches, including FIFA World Cup qualifiers and the Nations League Finals, to be broadcast mainly on CBS Sports Network and the Paramount+ streaming service, with some matches being broadcast nationwide on CBS. Univision Deportes has the Spanish language rights to all U.S. Soccer broadcasts from 2015 to 2022. These agreements do not apply to FIFA World Cup away qualifiers, whose rights are distributed by the host country. Therefore, these matches can often be found on other networks such as beIN Sports and Telemundo.

Starting in 2023, Telemundo acquired the Spanish-language rights to U.S. Soccer broadcasts.

Results and fixtures 

The following is a list of match results from the previous 12 months, as well as any future matches that have been scheduled.

2022

2023

Coaching staff

Coaching staff

Technical staff

Players

Current squad
The following 24 players were named to the squad for the 2022-23 CONCACAF Nations League matches against Grenada and El Salvador, March 24 and 27, 2023. 

Caps and goals are updated as of January 28, 2023, after the match against Colombia.

Recent call-ups
The following players have been called up for the team within the last twelve months.
 
 

 
 
 
 
 
 
 
 

 
 
 
 
 
 
  
 

 
 
 

 
 
 
 
 

PRE = Preliminary squad/standby
INJ = Injured

Individual records 

.
Players in bold are still active with the national team.

Most appearances

Top goalscorers

Competitive record

The U.S. regularly competes at the FIFA World Cup, the CONCACAF Gold Cup, the CONCACAF Nations League, and the Summer Olympics. The U.S. has also played in the FIFA Confederations Cup, the Copa América by invitation, as well as several minor tournaments.

The best result for the United States in a World Cup tournament came in 1930 when the team reached the semifinals. The team included six naturalized internationals, five of them from Scotland and one from England. The best result in the modern era is the 2002 World Cup, when the U.S. reached the quarterfinals. The worst world Cup tournament results in the modern era were group stage eliminations in 1990, 1998, and 2006, although the country failed to even qualify for the final tournament in 2018.

In the Confederations Cup, the United States finished in third place in both 1992 and 1999, and were runner-up in 2009. The United States appeared in their first intercontinental tournament final at the 2009 Confederations Cup. In the semifinals, the United States upset top ranked Spain 2–0, to advance to the final. In the final, the United States lost 3–2 to Brazil after leading 2–0 at halftime.

The U.S. men's soccer team have played in the Summer Olympics since 1924. From that tournament to 1980, only amateur and state-sponsored Eastern European players were allowed on Olympic teams. The Olympics became a full international tournament in 1984 after the IOC allowed full national teams from outside FIFA CONMEBOL & UEFA confederations. Ever since 1992 the men's Olympic event has been age-restricted, under 23 plus three overage players, and participation has been by the United States men's national under-23 soccer team.

In regional competitions, the United States has won the CONCACAF Gold Cup seven times, with their most recent title in 2021. They won the inaugural CONCACAF Nations League in 2021. Their best ever finish at the Copa América was fourth-place at the 1995 and 2016 editions.

FIFA World Cup

CONCACAF Gold Cup

CONCACAF Championship 1963–1989, CONCACAF Gold Cup 1991–present

CONCACAF Nations League

Copa América
South American Championship 1916–1967, Copa América 1975–present

Summer Olympics

FIFA Confederations Cup

Head-to-head record

Honors
Major competitions

 FIFA World Cup
Third place (1):  1930

 FIFA Confederations Cup
Runners-up (1):  2009
Third place (2):  1992, 1999

 CONCACAF Championship / Gold Cup
Champions (7):  1991, 2002, 2005, 2007, 2013, 2017, 2021
Runners-up (6):  1989, 1993, 1998, 2009, 2011, 2019
Third place (2):  1996, 2003
Fair Play Award (5): 2003, 2009, 2017, 2019, 2021

 CONCACAF Nations League
Champions (1):  2019–20

 Summer Olympics
Silver medal (1):  1904
Bronze medal (1):  1904

Other competitions

 CONCACAF Cup
Runners-up (1):  2015

 CONCACAF Olympic Qualifying Tournament
Runners-up (2):  1972, 1980
Third Place (1):  1964

 U.S. Cup
Champions (3):  1992, 1995, 2000
Runners-up (1):  1999
Third place (2):  1993, 1996

 Marlboro Cup
Champions (2):  1989, 1989
Runners-up (3):  1987, 1988, 1989
Third place (1):  1990

 North American Nations Cup
Runners-up (2):  1949, 1991
Third place (2):  1947, 1990

FIFA World Ranking

Last update was on January 1, 2022

Source:

 Best Ranking   Worst Ranking   Best Mover   Worst Mover

See also
 Fútbol de Primera Player of the Year
 United States men's national under-17 soccer team
 United States men's national under-20 soccer team
 United States men's national under-23 soccer team
 U.S. National Soccer Team Players Association
 U.S. Soccer Player of the Year
 United States women's national soccer team
 List of United States men's international soccer players born outside the United States

Notes

References

External links

 
 US Soccer Schedule at USSF
 US Soccer Results at USSF
 USA Matches at FIFA
 US National Soccer Team Players Association
 US soccer team at Association of Football Statisticians
 United States at FootballDatabase.eu
 USA Men's National Team: All-time Results, 1885–1989 
 USA Men's National Team: All-time Results, 1990–present 
 USA Men's National Team: Current Value of Players on Team

 
North American national association football teams
United States Soccer Federation